The Legend of the Holy Drinker is a 1988 Italian film written and directed by Ermanno Olmi.

The film won the Golden Lion at the 45th Venice Film Festival. It also won four David di Donatello Awards (for Best Film, Best Director, Best Cinematography and Best Editing) and two Silver Ribbons (for Best Director and Best Screenplay). The film was selected as the Italian entry for the Best Foreign Language Film at the 61st Academy Awards, but was not accepted as a nominee.

It is based on the 1939 novella by the Austrian novelist Joseph Roth.

Plot
A drunken homeless man (Rutger Hauer) in Paris is lent 200 francs by a stranger as long as he promises to repay it to a local church when he can afford to; the film depicts the man's constant frustrations as he attempts to do so.

Cast
 Rutger Hauer as Andreas Kartack
 Sandrine Dumas as Gabby
 Dominique Pinon as Woitech
 Anthony Quayle as The Distinguished Gentleman 
 Sophie Segalen as Karoline
 Cécile Paoli as Fur Store Seller 
 Jean-Maurice Chanet as Daniel Kanjak  
 Dalila Belatreche as Thérèse

See also
 List of submissions to the 61st Academy Awards for Best Foreign Language Film
 List of Italian submissions for the Academy Award for Best Foreign Language Film
  List of Italian films of 1988

References

External links 
 

1988 films
1988 drama films
Films about alcoholism
Films based on works by Joseph Roth
Films directed by Ermanno Olmi
Films set in Paris
Films set in the 1930s
1980s Italian-language films
Golden Lion winners
Italian drama films
French drama films
1980s Italian films
1980s French films